The Berthelot Islands are a group of rocky islands, the largest  long, lying  south-west of Deliverance Point, off the west coast of Graham Land, Antarctica. They were discovered by the French Antarctic Expedition, 1903–05, under Jean-Baptiste Charcot, and named by him for Marcellin Berthelot, a prominent French chemist. One of the group, Green Island, is protected as Antarctic Specially Protected Area (ASPA) No.108 because of its relatively luxuriant vegetation and large Antarctic shag colony.

See also 
 List of Antarctic and subantarctic islands
 Urchin Rock

References 

Islands of Graham Land
Graham Coast